Liam Bergin (born 24 November 1985) is a British actor of Irish and Trinidadian descent. He trained at the Guildhall School of Music and Drama, graduating in 2008. He is currently best known for playing Danny Mitchell in EastEnders and Rupert in Trinity. He has also had minor roles in Doctors and the 2009 remake of Minder.

On 26 December 2009 it was announced he had been cast in the role of Danny Mitchell in the long-running soap opera EastEnders. The character was phased out by mutual consent from the show with executive producer Bryan Kirkwood in April 2010. He returned for a guest stint between December 2016 and January 2017.

Since the summer of 2014, he has been running an independent clothing brand called 'Boom Done Shop'.

Filmography

References

External links
 
 United Agents
 Boom Done Shop

English male television actors
English people of Irish descent
Living people
1985 births
English people of Trinidad and Tobago descent
21st-century English male actors